is a railway station in Edogawa, Tokyo, Japan. Its station number is S-20. The station is the easternmost station in Tokyo. The station opened on 14 September 1986.

History 
 September 14, 1986 - The station opened．
 March 19, 1989 - The station be an intermediate station.
 May 20, 2008 - West gate (Twin Place side) opened.
 May 19, 2018 - Started to use platform screen doors.

Platforms
Shinozaki Station consists of a single island platform served by two tracks.

Surrounding area
The station is located underground just north of National Route 14 (Keiyō Road) and the Shuto Expressway's No. 7 Komatsugawa Line. Commercial and shopping facilities are clustered around the station, but the remainder is primarily residential. The Edogawa River is approximately 1 kilometer northeast. Other points of interest include:
 Edogawa Grounds
 Tokyo Metropolitan Shinozaki High School
 Edogawa Municipal Shinozaki Junior High School
 Edogawa Municipal Shinozaki 2nd Junior High School
 Edogawa Municipal Shinozaki Elementary School
 Kōtsu Kaikan Shinozaki Building
 Shinozaki Twin Place

Connecting bus service
Keisei Bus: Shinozaki-Eki
 Shino 01: for Edogawa City Hall
 Shinko 71: for Shin-Koiwa Station, Mizue Station
 Ko 72: for Edogawa Sports Land, Koiwa Station
Toei Bus: Shinozaki-Ekimae
 Funa 28: for Funabori Station

Line
 Tokyo Metropolitan Bureau of Transportation - Toei Shinjuku Line

On the first Saturday in August, Some express trains stop at this station because Edogawa fireworks festival is to be held.

References

External links
 Tokyo Metropolitan Bureau of Transportation: Shinozaki Station 
 

Railway stations in Japan opened in 1986
Railway stations in Tokyo
Edogawa, Tokyo